Dobrovolsky, sometimes spelled Dobrovolskiy or Dobrovolski, or Dobrovolskaya (feminine; Добровольская), is a Russian surname. Notable people with the surname include:

Alexey Dobrovolsky (1938–2013), Soviet-Russian dissident, co-founder of Russian Rodnoverie, and neo-Nazi
Anatoly Dobrovolsky (1910–1988), Ukrainian/Soviet architect
Galina Dobrovolskaya, head of Leningrad State Institute of Theatre, Music, and Cinema for some time
Georgy Dobrovolsky (1928–1971), Soviet cosmonaut and Hero of the Soviet Union
Igor Dobrovolski (born 1967), Soviet/Russian football player
Mikhail Dolivo-Dobrovolsky (1861–1919), Russian engineer, electrician, and inventor

Oleg Vasilyevich Dobrovolsky, Soviet astronomer, namesake of asteroid 3013 Dobrovoleva
Viktor Dobrovolsky (1906–?), Ukrainian/Soviet actor and People's Artist of the USSR
Vladimir Dobrovolsky (1834–1877), Russian military officer
 Vladimir Dobrovolsky (writer), co-writer of 1937 Soviet adventure film The Rich Bride

Yana Dobrovolskaya (born 1997), Miss Russia 2016
Yuri Dobrovolsky (1911–1979), Soviet aircraft pilot and Hero of the Soviet Union

See also 
 Dobrowolski, Polish surname

Russian-language surnames